Dylan Mavin is an Australian motorcycle racer. In 2008 and 2009 he was a competitor in the Red Bull MotoGP Rookies Cup racing series.

Grand Prix motorcycle racing

By season

Races by year

References

External links
 http://www.motogp.com/en/riders/Dylan+Mavin
 http://www.redbullrookiescup.com/athlete/dylan-mavin

Living people
Australian motorcycle racers
125cc World Championship riders
Year of birth missing (living people)